The Evans Bay Patent Slip is a heritage site of the former patent slip located in Evans Bay, in Wellington Harbour in the North Island of New Zealand. The first slipway on the site was commissioned in May 1863 to enable maintenance of the hulls of small vessels. The Wellington Provincial Council was keen to encourage shipping trade by improving facilities in Wellington Harbour and began planning later in 1863 for the construction of a larger patent slip. A concession was granted for the supply, construction and operation of a patent slip on the site. Equipment for the new slip was delivered in 1865 and 1866, but construction was delayed for several years because of a contractual dispute concerning the suitability of the design for the ground conditions. The original suppliers lost a court case and withdrew from the project. The Wellington Patent Slip Company was formed to take over the assets, and construction began in 1871. The Patent Slip was officially opened in March 1873. 

A second slipway was constructed at the site in 1922. The original slip operated until 1969, and the second was closed on 31 July 1980. Most equipment has been removed from the site, and a residential development now occupies some of the original land. However, the site has been listed as a Category 2 historic place by Heritage New Zealand, and the area is classified as a heritage zone by the Wellington City Council.

The first slipway
In 1863, the New Zealand Steam Navigation Company decided to build a slip at Greta Point in Evans Bay to make it easier to repair and clean ships' hulls. A contract was let to shipwright Edward Thirkell, and by May 1863 the slip was in operation. The slip itself consisted of two wooden "slideways" for the keel and the bilge, and the low end sat in eight feet (2.4 m) of water at low tide. Two manually-operated winches pulled ships up the runners. Edward Thirkell managed this slip and its successor until his death in 1882. The New Zealand Steam Navigation Company went into liquidation in 1871, and management of the slip passed to the newly formed Patent Slip Company. The wooden slip was in use at least until 1873, when the new slip was built slightly south of it.

The Patent Slip

The immediate success of the first slipway led the Wellington Provincial Council to investigate building a bigger slip that could handle larger ships. The Wellington Provincial Council was keen to have a slip capable of taking large vessels to increase the attractiveness of Wellington Harbour for the shipping trade. However, the Provincial Council was unable to fund the construction, and decided to grant a concession for a slipway to be built and operated. The concession was granted to Kennard Bros., of London.

Kennards manufactured and delivered hundreds of tons of machinery to Wellington in 1866. However there was a contractual dispute about extra work required due to the nature of the site at Evans Bay, so the equipment sat there on the beach for five years while the dispute was discussed. In 1871 Wellington businessmen formed the Wellington Patent Slip Company and bought the equipment from Kennards. Construction began in 1871 and was completed in May 1873.

The Evans Bay Patent Slip, the first in New Zealand, was a major engineering achievement. A 200-ton,  cradle moved on wheels along parallel rails. Two chains were used for hauling vessels out of the water and lowering them back down. The chains ran over a cogwheel winch powered by two steam engines. One end of the chain was attached to the cradle and the other dropped into a  well beneath the winding gear. This was used for lowering ships down the slip and for bringing up the empty cradle.

Construction on land above the high tide line was straightforward, but work under the water was much more complicated. Workers in a diving bell excavated the sea floor, shifting rock into a shallow iron box which they slid under the edge of the diving bell to be hauled to the surface and removed. The men worked in shifts of four to six hours. After this stage, a diver worked to position piles and join pieces together. Concrete was mixed in a boat on the surface and sent underwater down a tube with a canvas hose at the end so that the diver could direct the concrete to where it was needed. The workers underwater could only work in good weather conditions: in a southerly the current was strong enough to lift a diver off the sea floor. This was the first large-scale underwater construction in New Zealand.  A  jetty was also erected to improve communication with ships. Along with housing for the winches and boilers required to operate the slipways, there were some houses, a store, an inspector's office, a carpenter's shop, a messroom, and a blacksmith's shop.

On 2 May 1873, the 316-ton barque Cyprus was the first ship to use the slipway. If necessary, two ships could use the slip at the same time. The first ship would be raised up and then chocks put under it so that the cradle could be released and sent down to pull up a second ship. The press reported that the slip could handle ships weighing up to 2,000 tons and was "the finest and largest in the Australian colonies". By the late 1890s there were calls for a dry dock in Wellington, amid claims that the Patent Slip could not cope with the increased size and number of ships visiting Wellington. In 1908, Wellington Harbour Board purchased the assets of the Wellington Patent Slip Company and leased the operation to the Union Steam Ship Company, with conditions that a second slip be built. This was constructed in 1922. In 1961, the Union Steamship Company chose not to renew its lease, so the Harbour Board took over management of both slips until 1969. At that time slipway No. 1 was taken out of service and slipway No. 2 was upgraded. The slipway closed on 31 July 1980. The site was demolished and various equipment scrapped, sold or given to museums, and land was filled in for a new housing subdivision. 

The site was listed as a Category 2 historic place in 1982. Wellington City Council had the site rezoned as a heritage area in 2003, and the area is now known as Cog Park.

Incidents at the slip
Over the many years of operation there were several significant incidents at the Patent Slip.

Gallery

References

Wellington Harbour
History of the Wellington Region
Demolished buildings and structures in New Zealand
Transport buildings and structures in the Wellington Region
Heritage New Zealand Category 2 historic places in the Wellington Region